Michał Stachowicz (14 August 1768, in Kraków – 26 March 1825, in Kraków) was a Polish painter and graphic artist in the Romantic style.

Biography 
His father was a printer, bookbinder and bookseller. In 1787, he became a Master in the guild. From 1817 until his death, he was a teacher at Saint Barbara's gymnasium and, for many years, was a member of the Kraków Scientific Society. He died at his home and was buried at Rakowicki Cemetery.

In 1816, he received a major commission from Bishop  to do wall paintings at the Bishop's Palace, which took two years to complete. Only thirty-two years later, they were destroyed by a fire. In 1820, he was given another major commission from the architect, Sebastian Sierakowski, to paint a mural at the Collegium Maius depicting the history of the Jagiellonian University.

His best known works depicted contemporary historical events, many of which he witnessed, such as "Kościuszko's Oath on the Market Square" and "The Entrance of Prince Józef Poniatowski into Kraków". He also did genre scenes, portraits, and religious paintings; notably the Stations of the Cross at the Church of St. Casimir the Prince and images for two side altars at the church in Jangrot. He also worked as a lithographer and illustrated the Monumenta regum Poloniae Cracoviensia (Tombs of the Kings of Poland in Kraków).

Selected paintings

References

Further reading 
 Zbigniew Michalczyk: Michał Stachowicz (1768-1825): Krakowski malarz między barokiem a romantyzmem, Instytut Sztuki PAN, Warszawa 2011 .

External links 

 Article about Stachowicz from the Tygodnik Illustrowany, 1859.
 Monumenta Regum Poloniae Cracoviensia @ the Kujawsko-Pomorska Digital Library

1768 births
1825 deaths
18th-century Polish–Lithuanian painters
18th-century male artists
19th-century Polish painters
19th-century Polish male artists
History painters
Genre painters
Polish illustrators
Artists from Kraków
Polish male painters